Comercocha (possibly from Quechua q'umir green, qucha lake, "green lake") is a mountain in the Vilcanota mountain range in the Andes of Peru, about  high. It is situated in the Cusco Region, Canchis Province, Pitumarca District. Comercocha lies west of the lake Sibinacocha and the mountain Pichacani, between the mountain Huayruro Punco in the northeast and the Cóndor Tuco in the south.

References

Mountains of Peru
Mountains of Cusco Region